Amos Meller (1938 – January 23, 2007) is best remembered as an Israeli composer and conductor. He was born in Kibbutz Ein HaHoresh and died in Tel Aviv.

In his lifetime, he was a member if the Israeli volleyball team, a flutist, a violinist, and a poet.

During his career he led orchestras in China, Moscow, and France. In March 2003 he was asked to direct the Beijing Philharmonic Orchestra and also the Taipei Philharmonic Orchestra of Taiwan. He was the first Israeli to direct these orchestras.

References

1938 births
2007 deaths
Israeli conductors (music)
Israeli composers
20th-century conductors (music)